Saudin is a diterpenoid first isolated from the African flowering plant Cluytia richardiana.

Saudin has shown a hypoglycemic effect in an rodent model experiment.

Because of the unusual chemical structure and its potential biological activity, there has been research aimed at its total synthesis.

References

Diterpenes